Anna Russo is an Italian writer. She was born in Naples, and her debut as a writer partly came about after she received a major literary prize for travel writing: The Next Generation. As a result of the grant she lived for twelve years in southern France where she became close to the gypsies, particularly two of the "grand" families of Reyes and Baliardo. From this research and collaboration, she wrote two important books, Gitani si nasce e si diventa (We Are Born and We Become Gypsies) and El Cante Flamenco (The Flamenco Song), which received support from the Spanish Consulate in Italy and by the Cervantes Cultural Institute. 

Her meeting with the publisher Salani generated another book, La bambina Babilonia (The Girl Babilonia), which received great success and was awarded numerous prizes. Following this success, she signed with Einaudi Ragazzi, one of the most respected publishers in Italy. 

In 2006 she published Pao alla conquista del mondo (Pao Conquers the World), and in 2007, Caro Hamid, fratello lontano (Dear Hamid, Distant Brother).  They represent a decisive turn in the poetics and direction of this author.

In 2008 she published Ibrahim, il bambino del campo (Ibrahim, a Boy in the Field / The Secret Story of Ibrahim). In 2009 she published Il baffo del dittatore (The Dictator's Moustaches) with Mursia editore. In 2010 Caro Hamid, fratello lontano (Dear Hamid, Distant Brother) won the Stefany Gay-Taché Award.
In 2010 she published Chuang Tse e il primo imperatore (Chuang Tse and the First Emperor) with Alacran editore.

She lives in Rome.

Works 
Gitani si nasce e si diventa       Stampa alternativa  2003
El cante flamenco                  Stampa Alternativa  2004
La bambina Babilonia               Salani              2005
Pao alla conquista del mondo       Einaudi r.          2006
Caro Hamid, fratello lontano       Einaudi r.          2007
Ibrahim, a Boy in the Field        Fatatrac            2008
Il baffo del dittatore             Mursia              2009
The Dictator's Moustaches          Mursia              2009
Chuang Tse e il primo imperatore   Alacran             2010
Chuang Tse and the First Emperor   Alacran             2010
Seven Billion                      Smashwords          2011
Pao Conquers the World             A new life          2012
The Secret Story of Ibrahim        A new life          2013
Barattolo                          A new life          2014
Alfabeto Magico                    A new life          2015

References

External links
Anna Russo official site

Italian women writers
Italian writers
Year of birth missing (living people)
Living people